Ingrid Scholz is a retired German rower who won a gold, a silver and a bronze medal at the European championships of 1953–1957. Those were the first medals for Germany in female rowing, a sport that was then dominated by the Soviet Union.

References

Year of birth missing (living people)
Living people
German female rowers
European Rowing Championships medalists
20th-century German women